is a Japanese actor, voice actor and narrator currently affiliated with Haiyuza Theatre Company. He has done popular voicing roles in Hajime no Ippo, Utawarerumono, Kamen no Maid Guy and Yakuza, and has become well known for voicing Yamato in Naruto Shippuden and Kogoro Mouri in Case Closed. In addition, he is known for voicing rather tall or massive inhuman villains like Coyote Starrk in Bleach, Fukuro in Fairy Tail and Deep Sea King in One Punch Man. He is the official dub-over artist of George Clooney, Kiefer Sutherland, Dwayne Johnson and Ma Dong-seok. In addition, he dubbed many roles of Denzel Washington, Keanu Reeves and Guy Pearce.

Biography 
By the time Koyama was in high school, his voice had already taken on the quality it has today, and when he answered the phone at the time, his own aunt would sometimes mistake him for his father. After attending Ritsumeikan Junior and Senior High School, Koyama entered the law department at Ritsumeikan University in 1982. He became a member of Ritsumeikan Art Theatre Company. At the time, he was performing the works of Minoru Betsuyaku and Kōhei Tsuka. After graduating from college in 1987, he moved from Kyoto to Tokyo to study theater at Toho Gakuen College of Drama and Music. He was a member of the swimming club and had no qualms about wearing a swimsuit. After graduation, he joined the Haiyuza Theatre Company and made his debut as an actor in Kamen Rider Black RX in 1989. In RX, he performed most of the action scenes himself, including wire fu and napalm explosions, except for some dangerous scenes. Due to his connection with the producers of the series, Nagafumi Hori and Susumu Yoshikawa, he often made guest appearances in the Metal Hero Series that they were in charge of.

Koyama made his debut as a voice actor in ER and initially focused on dubbing, but since the 2000s he has also appeared in many anime and video games. In addition, Utawarerumono Radio led to a surge in radio programs in which he worked with various female voice actors. In anime, he plays many austere characters, but he covers the gamut from serious to gag, from good guys to cold-hearted villains, comical roles to dynamic ones, and from lustful characters like Kristofor in the game Infinite Undiscovery to the aloof and free-spirited role of Leonard in the Angelique series. Since he has been working more as a voice actor, Koyama has not made many appearances as an actor. In 2009, he was asked to play the role of Joe of Haze in Kamen Rider Decade, the same role he played in RX, but he turned it down due to his age and discomfort with the image of the role.

Koyama has also been active as a stage actor, actively participating in stage performances in Europe (England, France, the Netherlands, Romania, Italy, and Russia) since around 2000, and his performance as Antonio in The Merchant of Venice in 2001 won the Outstanding Performance Award at the 9th Yomiuri Theater Awards. In 2011, Koyama won the Kei Tomiyama Memorial Award at the 5th Seiyu Awards.

Koyama's role of Jack Bauer in 24 is one of his most popular roles. At the end of 2010, he met Kiefer at the 24 final season campaign and fan thanksgiving event.

Filmography

Television animation

Original video animation (OVA) 
Rurouni Kenshin: Trust & Betrayal (1999): Hijikata Toshizō
Fushigi Yūgi Eikoden (2001): Shu Tendo
Hajime no Ippo – Mashiba vs. Kimura (2003): Mamoru Takamura
Full Metal Panic! The Second Raid (2005): Belfangan Grouseaux
The Wings of Rean (2005): Shinjirō Sakomizu
Ghost in the Shell: Stand Alone Complex – Individual Eleven (2006): Hideo Kuze
Mahou Sensei Negima: Mō Hitotsu no Sekai (2009): Jack Rakan
Dogs: Bullets & Carnage (2009): Fuyumine
Akaneiro ni Somaru Saka Hardcore (2009): Sejirō Sugishita
Mobile Suit Gundam Unicorn (2010): Flaste Schole

Original net animation (ONA) 
The Way of the Househusband (2021): Senpai Cat
Pokémon: Hisuian Snow (2022): Alec's Father

Anime films 
Vampire Hunter D: Bloodlust (2000): Public Official
Cowboy Bebop: The Movie (2001): Steve
Tokyo Godfathers (2003): Bridegroom
Hajime no Ippo – Champion Road (2003): Mamoru Takamura
Fullmetal Alchemist the Movie: Conqueror of Shamballa (2005): Rudolf Hess
JoJo's Bizarre Adventure: Phantom Blood (2007): William A. Zeppeli
Kite Liberator (2008): Orudo Noguchi
SD Gundam Sangokuden Brave Battle Warriors (2010): Koshin Gyan
Detective Conan: Dimensional Sniper (2014): Kogoro Mori
Saint Seiya: Legend of Sanctuary (2014): Taurus Aldebaran
Dance with Devils: Fortuna (2017): Nesta
Bungo Stray Dogs: DEAD APPLE (2018): Yukichi Fukuzawa
My Hero Academia: Two Heroes (2018): Wolfram
Psycho-Pass: Sinners of the System (2019): Rodion Matsuki
Promare (2019): Ignis Ex
Blackfox (2019): Harold
Human Lost (2019): Atsugi
Demon Slayer: Kimetsu no Yaiba the Movie: Infinity Train (2020): Shinjuro Rengoku
The Tunnel to Summer, the Exit of Goodbyes (2022): Kaoru's father

Video games 

Glass Rose: Koutaro Katagiri
JoJo's Bizarre Adventure: Phantom Blood: Will A. Zeppeli
Yakuza 4: Taiga Saejima
Ultimate Marvel vs. Capcom 3: Frank West
Project X Zone: Frank West
Yakuza 5: Taiga Saejima
Final Fantasy XIV: A Realm Reborn: Cid nan Garlond
JoJo's Bizarre Adventure: All Star Battle: Yoshikage Kira, "Kosaku Kawajiri"
Ryū ga Gotoku Ishin!: Nagakura Shinpachi
Yakuza 0: Taiga Saejima
Xenoblade Chronicles X: Douglas
Fate/Grand Order (2015): EMIYA (Assassin)
Devil May Cry 4: Special Edition: Credo
JoJo's Bizarre Adventure: Eyes of Heaven: Yoshikage Kira, "Kosaku Kawajiri"
#COMPASS (2016): Luciano
NightCry: Leonard
Yakuza 6: The Song of Life ): Taiga Saejima
Yakuza: Like a Dragon: Taiga Saejima
Nioh 2: Saitō Toshimitsu
Disney Twisted-Wonderland (2020): Mozus Trein
Jujutsu Kaisen: Phantom Parade: Kensuke Nagino

Unknown date
Ace Combat 6: Fires of Liberation: Marcus "Shamrock" Lampert
Angelique Etoile: Leonard
Another Eden: Bertrand
Armored Core 2: Leos Klein
Code: Realize ~Sousei no Himegimi~: Jimmy A Arester
Daemon Bride: Uriel/Dawn
Detective Conan: Tsuioku no Mirajiyu: Tadaki Kai
Drakengard 2: Urick
Eat Lead: The Return of Matt Hazard: Matt Hazard
Everybody's Golf 5:Nakajima
Fantasy Earth: Zero: King Huenkel
Fate/stay night: Kiritsugu Emiya
Fate/tiger colosseum Upper: Kiritsugu Emiya
Final Fantasy XII: Basch
Granado Espada (Japanese version): Nar
Halo 4, Halo 5: Guardians (Japanese version): Master Chief
Infinite Undiscovery: Kristofor
Jak II (Japanese version): Torn
Lego Marvel Super Heroes (Japanese version): Daredevil
Metroid: Other M: Adam Malkovich
Musou Orochi: Rebirth of the Demon Lord: Sun Wukong
No More Heroes: Heroes' Paradise: Thunder Ryu
One Piece World Seeker: Isaac
Phantasy Star Universe: Leogini Santosa Berafort
Ryū ga Gotoku Ishin!: (Nagakura Shinpachi)
Sengoku Basara 3: Kuroda Kanbei
Shin Sangoku Musou: Multi Raid 2: Shi Huangdi
Shining Resonance: Georg
Star Ocean: Second Evolution: Gabriel
Super Robot Wars series: Ricardo Silveira, Gaiou, Shinjirou Sakomizu, Belfangan Grouseaux
Sword Art Online: Fatal Bullet: Bazalt Joe
Tales of Innocence: Asura
Tales of Vesperia: Duke
Tenchu 4: Rikimaru
Time Crisis 4: Terrorist Leader
Too Human (Japanese version): Baldr
Trauma Center: New Blood: Markus Vaughn
Warriors Orochi 3: Nemea, Sun Wukong
White Knight Chronicles: Cyrus

Tokusatsu roles 
Kamen Rider Black RX (1989): Joe of Haze
Blue SWAT (1994): Toru Harada
Kamen Rider × Kamen Rider Gaim & Wizard: The Fateful Sengoku Movie Battle (2013): Bujin Gaim (voice)
Kamen Rider Drive: Surprise Future (2015): Spider-Type Roidmude 108 (Past)/Paradox Roidmude (voice)
Kamen Rider Zi-O (2018): Ziku-Driver Related Item Voice (Voiced by Yōhei Ōnishi), OP Narrator, Ohma Zi-O (eps. 1, 15, 16, 30, 40 – ) (voice)
Tensou Sentai Goseiger (2010): Alien Zutinma Dereputa of the Meteor (eps. 1–12 & 16) (voice)
Tokkei Winspector (1990): Matsuyama
Tokkyuu Shirei Solbrain (1991): Sekine (ep. 50)
Tokusou Exceedraft (1992): Dr. Obayashi's assistant
Tokusou Robo Janperson (1993): Takase
Tokusou Sentai Dekaranger: 10 YEARS AFTER (2015): Kight Reidich (voice)

Other live-action 
 Wonderful World (2010, film): Atsushi Ito
 Kami Voice (2011, film)
 No Dropping Out: Back to School at 35 (2013, TV): narrator
 Reach Beyond the Blue Sky (2021, TV): Sakai Tadashige

Dubbing roles

Live-action

George Clooney
ER: Doug Ross
Friends: Dr. Michael Mitchell
One Fine Day (2001 TV Asahi edition): Jack Taylor
Batman & Robin (2000 TV Asahi edition): Bruce Wayne/Batman
The Peacemaker: Thomas Devoe
Out of Sight: Jack Foley
Three Kings: Major Archie Gates
The Perfect Storm: Frank William "Billy" Tyne
O Brother, Where Art Thou?: Ulysses Everett McGill
Fail Safe: Col. Jack Grady
Ocean's Eleven: Daniel "Danny" Ocean
Spy Kids (DVD/VHS edition): Devlin
Confessions of a Dangerous Mind: Jim Byrd
Welcome to Collinwood: Jerzy
Intolerable Cruelty: Miles Massey
Spy Kids 3-D: Game Over: Devlin
Ocean's Twelve: Daniel "Danny" Ocean
Good Night, and Good Luck: Fred W. Friendly
Syriana: Bob Barnes
Michael Clayton: Michael Raymond Clayton
Ocean's Thirteen: Daniel "Danny" Ocean
Burn After Reading: Harry Pfarrer
Leatherheads: Jimmy "Dodge" Connelly
The Men Who Stare at Goats: Lyn Cassady
Up in the Air: Ryan Bingham
The American: Jack
The Ides of March: Mike Morris
Gravity: Matt Kowalski
Money Monster: Lee Gates
Hail, Caesar!: Baird Whitlock
Kiefer Sutherland
Chicago Joe and the Showgirl (2009 DVD edition): Karl Hulten
Last Light (2009 DVD edition): Denver Bayliss
Freeway (2008 DVD edition): Bob Wolverton
Ground Control (2008 DVD edition): Jack Harris
24: Jack Bauer
Dead Heat: Pally LaMarr
Desert Saints: Arthur Banks
Paradise Found: Paul Gauguin
Taking Lives (2008 TV Asahi edition): Christopher Hart
River Queen: Doyle
The Sentinel: David Breckinridge
Mirrors: Ben Carson
The Confession: The Confessor
The Reluctant Fundamentalist: Jim Cross
Touch: Martin Bohm
Pompeii: Senator Corvus
Forsaken: John Henry Clayton
Zoolander 2: Kiefer Sutherland
Designated Survivor: Tom Kirkman
Denzel Washington
Crimson Tide (2000 TV Asahi edition): Commander Ron Hunter
Courage Under Fire (2004 TV Asahi edition): Lieutenant Colonel Nathaniel Serling
Fallen (2002 Fuji TV edition): Detective John Hobbes
The Siege: Anthony Hubbard
The Bone Collector (2002 TV Asahi edition): Lincoln Rhyme
John Q. (2007 NTV edition): John Quincy Archibald
Antwone Fisher: LCDR Dr. Jerome Davenport
Man on Fire (2016 Netflix edition): John W. Creasy
The Manchurian Candidate: Major Bennett Marco
Safe House: Tobin Frost
Flight: William "Whip" Whitaker, Sr.
Dwayne Johnson
The Scorpion King: Mathayus
The Rundown: Beck
Gridiron Gang: Sean Porter
Southland Tales: Boxer Santaros/Jericho Cane
Fast Five: Luke Hobbs
Fast & Furious 6: Luke Hobbs
Furious 7: Luke Hobbs
The Fate of the Furious: Luke Hobbs
Baywatch: Mitch Buchannon
Hobbs & Shaw: Luke Hobbs
Jungle Cruise: Captain Frank "Skipper" Wolff
Louis Koo
Bullets Over Summer: Brian
For Bad Boys Only: Jack Shum
The Legend of Zu: Red
Rob-B-Hood: Octopus
SPL II: A Time for Consequences: Hung Mun-Gong
Three: Chief Inspector Ken
League of Gods: General Leopard
Call of Heroes: Cho Siu-lun
Line Walker 2: Invisible Spy: Security Wing Superintendent Cheng
The White Storm 2: Drug Lords: Fung Chun-kwok
Keanu Reeves
The Matrix series: Thomas Anderson /Neo 
The Matrix (VHS/DVD/Blu-ray edition) – 
The Matrix Reloaded (VHS/DVD/Blu-ray and Theatrical edition) 
The Matrix Revolutions (VHS/DVD/Blu-ray and Theatrical edition) 
The Matrix Resurrections 
The Watcher (2005 TV Tokyo edition): David Allen Griffin
Hardball: Conor O'Neill
Constantine (DVD and Blu-ray edition): John Constantine
A Scanner Darkly: Bob Arctor
Man of Tai Chi: Donaka Mark
Cuba Gooding Jr.
A Murder of Crows: Lawson Russell
Instinct: Dr. Theo Caulder
Chill Factor: Arlo
Men of Honor: Carl Brashear
Pearl Harbor: Doris Miller
Snow Dogs: Dr. Theodore "Ted" Brooks
Hardwired: Luke Gibson
Gerard Butler
Shooters: Jackie Junior
Timeline: André Marek
Dear Frankie: The Stranger
The Game of Their Lives: Frank Borghi
Gamer: John "Kable" Tillman
Gods of Egypt: Set
Guy Pearce
Ravenous: Capt. John Boyd
Memento: Leonard
Two Brothers: Aidan McCrory
Fragments: Dr. Bruce Laraby
Jack Irish series: Jack Irish
Breathe In: Keith Reynolds
Aaron Kwok
The Storm Riders: Striding Cloud/Bou Ging Wan
China Strike Force: Darren Tong
Cold War: Sean K.F. Lau
The Monkey King: Bull Demon King
The Monkey King 2: Sun Wukong/Monkey King
The Monkey King 3: Sun Wukong
Antonio Banderas
Interview with the Vampire (2000 TV Tokyo edition): Armand
Spy Kids (Netflix/Hulu edition): Gregorio Cortez
Femme Fatale: Nicolas Bardo
Ballistic: Ecks vs. Sever (2009 TV Asahi edition): Agent Jeremiah Ecks
My Mom's New Boyfriend: Tommy Lucero/Tomas Martinez
Stephen Dorff
FeardotCom: Detective Mike Reilly
Felon: Wade Porter
Brake: Jeremy Reins
Zaytoun: Yoni
Embattled: Cash "The Slayer" Boykins
Christian Bale
Captain Corelli's Mandolin: Mandras
Reign of Fire: Quinn
Equilibrium: John Preston
The Machinist: Trevor Reznik
Dougray Scott
Arabian Nights: Sultan Shahryar/Amin
Ripley's Game: Jonathan Trevanny
Dark Water: Kyle Williams
Death Race 3: Inferno: Niles York
Jason Clarke
Everest: Rob Hall
Terminator Genisys: John Connor/T-3000
The Man with the Iron Heart: Reinhard Heydrich
Pet Sematary: Dr. Louis Creed
Nicolas Cage
The Rock (1999 NTV edition): Stanley Goodspeed
City of Angels: Seth
Windtalkers (2005 TV Asahi edition): Sergeant Joe Enders
Left Behind: Rayford Steele
Ma Dong-seok
Train to Busan: Sang-hwa
Along with the Gods: The Last 49 Days: Seongju
The Gangster, the Cop, the Devil: Jang Dong-soo
Ashfall: Professor Kang Bong-rae
Prabhas
Baahubali: The Beginning:  Shivudu alias Mahendra Baahubali and Amarendra Baahubali
Baahubali 2: The Conclusion:  Shivudu alias Mahendra Baahubali and Amarendra Baahubali
Saaho: Ashok Chakravarthy / Siddhant Nandan Saaho
101 Dalmatians (2001 TV Asahi edition): Roger Dearly (Jeff Daniels)
Abandon: Wade Handler (Benjamin Bratt)
Air America: Rio Arnet (Lorenzo Lamas)
Ali: Muhammad Ali (Will Smith)
Aliens (2004 TV Asahi edition): Corporal Dwayne Hicks (Michael Biehn)
Aliens vs. Predator: Requiem: Sheriff Eddie Morales (John Ortiz)
All About the Benjamins: Tyson Bucum (Ice Cube)
Ally McBeal: Doctor Greg Butters (Jesse L. Martin)
Angels & Demons: Inspector General Ernesto Olivetti (Pierfrancesco Favino)
Atomic Train: John Seger (Rob Lowe)
Attack Force: Dwayne (David Kennedy)
Austenland: Mr. Henry Nobley (JJ Feild)
Battlefield Earth: Ker (Forest Whitaker)
Belly of the Beast: Sunti (Byron Mann)
Belly of the Beast (2007 TV Tokyo edition): Leon Washington (Patrick Robinson)
Black Book: Hans Akkermans (Thom Hoffman)
Black Water: Adam (Andy Rodoreda)
Brotherhood of the Wolf: Mani (Mark Dacascos)
Burn Notice: Simon Escher (Garret Dillahunt)
Cat People (2003 DVD edition): Paul Gallier (Malcolm McDowell)
Charlie Jade: Charlie Jade (Jeffrey Pierce)
Che: Ernesto "Che" Guevara (Benicio del Toro)
Chicago: Fred Casely (Dominic West)
Children of Men: Luke (Chiwetel Ejiofor)
Clash of the Titans: King Acrisius/Calibos (Jason Flemyng)
Cold Case: Joseph Shaw (Kenny Johnson)
Connie and Carla: Jeff (David Duchovny)
Contact: Willie (Max Martini)
Crash: Cameron Thayer (Terrence Howard)
Crime and Punishment in Suburbia: Chris (Jeffrey Wright)
Curse of the Golden Flower: Emperor Ping (Chow Yun-fat)
Daredevil: Matt Murdock/Daredevil (Ben Affleck)
The Deep End of the Ocean: Pat Cappadora (Treat Williams)
Desperate Housewives: Bill Pearce (Mark Deklin)
The Dilemma: Ronny Valentine (Vince Vaughn)
Don't Breathe 2: Raylan (Brendan Sexton III)
Due South: Benton Fraser (Paul Gross)
El tiempo entre costuras: Ramiro Arribas Querol (Rubén Cortada)
Enemy of the State (2003 Fuji TV edition): Loren Hicks (Loren Dean)
The Exorcist: Father Marcus Keane (Ben Daniels)
Exodus: Gods and Kings: Ramesses II (Joel Edgerton)
Feast: Hero (Eric Dane)
The Final Cut: Fletcher (Jim Caviezel)
Flight of the Living Dead: Outbreak on a Plane: Paul Judd (Richard Tyson)
The Forbidden Kingdom: The Jade Warlord (Collin Chou)
Frankenfish: Sam Rivers (Tory Kittles)
Full Frontal: Calvin/Nicholas (Blair Underwood)
Ghost in the Shell: Hideo Kuze (Michael Pitt)
Gone with the Wind (2000 TV Tokyo edition): Frank Kennedy (Carroll Nye)
The Great Escape (2000 TV Tokyo edition): Louis Sedgwick (James Coburn)
Halo: Master Chief (Pablo Schreiber)
The Hard Corps: Wayne Barclay (Razaaq Adoti)
Hitler: The Rise of Evil: Ernst Hanfstaengl (Liev Schreiber)
Hope Floats: Bill Pruitt (Michael Paré)
Hostage: Marshall "Mars" Krupcheck (Ben Foster)
The Hunted: Aaron Hallam (Benicio del Toro)
In America: Johnny Sullivan (Paddy Considine)
In Enemy Hands: Captain Jonas Herdt (Til Schweiger)
In Hell: Kyle LeBlanc (Jean-Claude Van Damme)
Inception (2012 TV Asahi edition): Robert Fischer (Cillian Murphy)
Invincible: Vince Papale (Mark Wahlberg)
Ip Man 4: The Finale: Barton Geddes (Scott Adkins)
K-19: The Widowmaker: Captain Mikhail Polenin (Liam Neeson)
Kamen Rider: Dragon Knight: Frank Taylor (Jeff Davis)
Kate & Leopold: Stuart Besser (Liev Schreiber)
Killing Me Softly: Adam (Joseph Fiennes)
La Vie en Rose: Marcel Cerdan (Jean-Pierre Martins)
Land of the Dead: Foxy (Tony Nappo)
Lara Croft: Tomb Raider – The Cradle of Life: Sean (Til Schweiger)
The Legend of Bagger Vance: Bagger Vance (Will Smith)
Legionnaire: Luther (Adewale Akinnuoye-Agbaje)
Lethal Weapon 4: Martin Riggs (Mel Gibson)
Little City: Kevin (Jon Bon Jovi)
The Lord of the Rings trilogy: Boromir (Sean Bean)
The Magnificent Seven (2013 Star Channel edition): Britt (James Coburn)
A Man Apart: Jack "Hollywood" Slayton (Timothy Olyphant)
Mars Attacks!: Billy-Glenn Norris (Jack Black)
The Master: Freddie Quell (Joaquin Phoenix)
Memories of Murder: Detective Seo Tae-yoon (Kim Sang-kyung)
Mentors: King Arthur (Daniel Gillies)
Miami Vice: Ricardo Tubbs (Jamie Foxx)
Midnight in Paris: Ernest Hemingway (Corey Stoll)
Monk: Gavin Lloyd (Ben Bass)
Mother's Day: Bradley Barton (Jason Sudeikis)
Mr. & Mrs. Smith: Eddie (Vince Vaughn)
The Mummy Returns: Lock-Nah (Adewale Akinnuoye-Agbaje)
The Musketeers: Emile Bonnaire (James Callis)
My Best Friend's Wedding: Michael O'Neal (Dermot Mulroney)
Nash Bridges: Ricky Allen Klinsmann (Kirk Fox)
The Net: Jack Devlin (Jeremy Northam)
The Next Best Thing: Ben Cooper (Benjamin Bratt)
Night at the Museum: Secret of the Tomb: Laaa (Ben Stiller)
No Escape: Hawkins (Ernie Hudson)
On the Occasion of Remembering the Turning Gate: Gyung-soo (Kim Sang-kyung)
Payback: Porter (Mel Gibson)
A Perfect Murder: David Shaw (Viggo Mortensen)
Picture Claire: Detective Lee (Raoul Bhaneja)
Piranha 3D: Novak (Adam Scott)
Planet of the Apes (2005 NTV edition): Thade (Tim Roth)
Police Story (2012 Ultimate Blu-Ray edition): Danny Chu Ko (Fung Hark-On)
Pride and Prejudice: Mr. Darcy (Colin Firth)
Psycho (2010 Blu-Ray edition): Sam Loomis (John Gavin)
The Punisher: Frank Castle/Punisher (Thomas Jane)
The Purifiers: John (Gordon Alexander)
Pushing Tin: Russell Bell (Billy Bob Thornton)
Quo Vadis: Marcus Vinicius (Paweł Deląg)
Ransom: Tom Mullen (Mel Gibson)
Rebecca (DVD edition): Maxim de Winter (Laurence Olivier)
Resident Evil: Apocalypse: Nicholai Ginovaeff (Zack Ward)
Robin Hood: Robin Hood (Jonas Armstrong)
Roger Corman's Operation Rogue: Capt. Max Randall (Mark Dacascos)
Rollerball: Marcus Ridley (LL Cool J)
Runaway Jury: Lawrence Greene (Jeremy Piven)
Sahara: Dirk Pitt (Matthew McConaughey)
The Sentinel: Det. Jim Ellison (Richard Burgi)
Secret Agent Man: Davis (Dondre Whitfield)
Sherlock Holmes: Lord Coward (Hans Matheson)
Sidewalks of New York: Tommy Reilly (Edward Burns)
Snakes on a Plane: Three G's (Flex Alexander)
Someone Like You: Eddie Alden (Hugh Jackman)
Spartacus series: Spartacus (Andy Whitfield/Liam McIntyre)
Star Wars: Episode II – Attack of the Clones: Captain Gregar Typho (Jay Laga'aia)
Star Wars: Episode III – Revenge of the Sith: Captain Gregar Typho (Jay Laga'aia)
Starship Troopers: Traitor of Mars: Colonel Johnny Rico (Casper Van Dien)
Stealth: Lieutenant Ben Gannon (Josh Lucas)
The Sum of All Fears: John Clark (Liev Schreiber)
Sweet Home Alabama: Jake Perry (Josh Lucas)
Swordfish: Stanley Jobson (Hugh Jackman)
Taxi: Det. Andrew "Andy" Washburn (Jimmy Fallon)
The Terminator (2003 TV Tokyo edition): Kyle Reese (Michael Biehn)
The Thieves: Andrew (Oh Dal-su)
The Towering Inferno (2013 BS Japan edition): Michael O'Hallorhan (Steve McQueen)
Trapped: Dr. Will Jennings (Stuart Townsend)
Triple 9: Russell Welch (Norman Reedus)
Typhoon: Sin (Jang Dong-gun)
Under the Tuscan Sun: Marcello (Raoul Bova)
Underworld series: Kraven (Shane Brolly)
Unstoppable: Dean Cage (Wesley Snipes)
Vampires: Jan Valek (Thomas Ian Griffith)
Van Helsing: Velkan Valerious (Will Kemp)
Walk the Line: Johnny Cash (Joaquin Phoenix)
The Walking Dead: Daryl Dixon (Norman Reedus)
The Warlords: General Pang Qingyun (Jet Li)
The Watcher: Joel Campbell (James Spader)
Wedding Crashers: Jeremy Grey (Vince Vaughn)
The Wedding Planner: Steve Edison (Matthew McConaughey)
The West Wing: Lt. Cmdr. Jack Reese (Christian Slater)
Wheels on Meals: Thug #1 (Benny Urquidez)
Wild Things: Sam Lombardo (Matt Dillon)
Without a Trace: Danny Taylor (Enrique Murciano)
Wrong Turn: Chris Flynn (Desmond Harrington)
Your Highness: Prince Thadeous (Danny McBride)
Zombieland: Double Tap: Tallahassee (Woody Harrelson)

Animation
Atlantis: Milo's Return: Vincenzo Santorini
Baahubali: The Lost Legends: Amarendra Baahubali
Chuggington: Action Chugger
Epic: Ronin
Final Fantasy: The Spirits Within: Gray Edwards
Finding Nemo: Crush
Finding Dory: Crush
The Nut Job: Raccoon
Resident Evil: Degeneration: Curtis Miller
South Park: Bigger, Longer & Uncut: Dr. Gouache, Conan O'Brien, The Baldwin Brothers
Star Wars: Clone Wars: Captain Gregar Typho
Star Wars: The Clone Wars: Captain Gregar Typho
Star Wars: Droids (2005 DVD edition): Mungo Baobab
Team America: World Police: Chris

References

External links 
  
  
 Rikiya Koyama at GamePlaza-Haruka Voice Acting Database 
 Rikiya Koyama at Hitoshi Doi's Seiyuu Database 
 

1963 births
Living people
Japanese male film actors
Japanese male stage actors
Japanese male television actors
Japanese male video game actors
Japanese male voice actors
Male voice actors from Kyoto
Ritsumeikan University alumni
20th-century Japanese male actors
21st-century Japanese male actors